Huaihua Zhijiang Airport  is an airport serving the city of Huaihua in Hunan Province, China. It is located in Zhijiang Dong Autonomous County, 31 kilometers from the city center.  The airport was built in 1942 and was the second largest military airfield in the Far East for the Allies during World War II.  On 21 August 1945 Japan officially surrendered to China near the airfield. Construction to convert the airport for civilian use was started in December 2002 and the airport was reopened in September 2004.

Airlines and destinations

World War II
During World War II, the airport was known as Chihkiang (Chih Kiang) Airfield (which is the Wade-Giles transcription of the same name) and was used by the United States Army Air Forces Fourteenth Air Force as part of the China Defensive Campaign (1942–1945).  Its primary use by the Americans was as an airborne photo-reconnaissance and as a transport airfield.

Chihkiang Air Base was also the headquarters of the Fourteenth Air Force Chinese-American Composite Wing (Provisional) (CACW), whose squadrons flew P-40 Warhawk aircraft.  The operational units of the CACW were jointly commanded by both American and Chinese air force officers, and the unit's aircraft were  jointly manned by American and Chinese pilots and air crewmen.  On 10 April 1945, the Japanese started an offensive for Chihkiang, however, by 10 May the CACW had attacked and mauled the Japanese forces so severely, the Japanese had to retreat to Paoching.

The Americans closed their facilities at the airport in early October 1945.

See also
List of airports in China

References

Airports in Hunan
Airfields of the United States Army Air Forces in China
Airports established in 1942
1942 establishments in China
Transport in Huaihua